"#Nobody" is a song by English musician James Cottriall. It was released in Austria as a digital download on 3 January 2014 as the second single from his third studio album Common Ground. The song peaked at number 40 on the Austrian Singles Chart.

Track listing
 Digital download
 "#Nobody" (Radio Edit) - 2:58

Charts

Release history

References

2013 songs
2014 singles
James Cottriall songs